Chrysostomos Dimitriou (in  ; 1889 – 22 October 1958), also known by his episcopal names of Chrysostomos of Zakynthos or Chrysostomos of Trifylia and Olympia, was the Eastern Orthodox bishop of the island of Zakynthos during World War II and the bishop of Trifylia and Olympia postwar until his death.

He is known to have, together with mayor Lucas Carrer, saved the Jews of the island from the Holocaust and for this was awarded the title of Righteous Among the Nations.

Before World War II 
Chrysostomos Dimitriou was born in 1889 in the city of the Piraeus, the main port of Athens. He studied theology in the Theological School of Athens and was ordained as a deacon on July 1916 and then priest the 11 March 1917 by Theoklitos I of Athens. He then served as a preacher in the diocese of Demetrias and Thebes before being sent to study theology in Munich, Germany, where he learned German.

After his return to Greece, he was named Secretary of the Holy Synod of the Church of Greece before being ordained as the Metropolitan of Zakynthos. Since the beginning of his work in Zakynthos, he showed sympathy toward the Jews of the island and for that, was criticized by Orthodox fanatics. In 1935, he joined the Old Calendarist sect, but after being condemned by the Holy Synod, he issued public repentance and was admitted back as the legitimate Metropolitan of Zakynthos.

World War II 

During the first part of the war, the island fell under Italian occupation. He made a commitment in favor of the prisoners of war to obtain their release. He was arrested by the authorities and exiled to Athens for a year before returning to his bishopric. On 9 September 1943, six days after Italy's surrender, the Germans took possession of the island. The Nazis began making plans to deport Jews from the island, who had survived the Holocaust so far. They asked the metropolitan and mayor Lucas Carrer to give them a list of the Jews residing on the island to proceed to the deportation. 

Dimitriou asked Lucas Carrer to burn the list and went to the German governor, Lütt. He told him that the Jews on the island were "part of his flock" and that he could not give him the list, then, wrote his name on a piece of paper and said "Here is the list". After warning the Jewish community, which hid in the mountains of the island, he promised them that the Greek islanders would protect them, and despite attempts by the Germans to proceed anyways with the deportation, the Jewish community of Zakynthos was left relatively unhindered.

Dimitriou said he had followed the orders of the Archbishop of Athens, Damaskinos, who declared : "I have taken up my cross. I spoke to the Lord, and made up my mind to save as many Jewish souls as possible."

After World War II 
After the war, the Jewish community financed the stained glass windows of the Saint Dimitrios Church in Zakynthos in his honor. He was then transferred, shortly before his death, to the Metropolis of Trifylia and Olympia, before dying in Athens on 22 October 1958.

On 7 November 1978, he was awarded the title of Righteous Among the Nations, along with Lucas Carrer, for his actions to protect Jews from the Holocaust.

Notes and references 

1889 births
1958 deaths
20th-century Eastern Orthodox bishops
20th-century Eastern Orthodox archbishops
People from Piraeus
Eastern Orthodox Christians from Greece
Eastern Orthodox Righteous Among the Nations
Greek Righteous Among the Nations
Eastern Orthodox Christians opposed to Nazi Germany